Andrew Brennan (born 1 April 1993) is an Australian professional footballer who plays as a winger or striker for South Melbourne.

In May 2019, Brennan came out as gay, becoming the first openly gay Australian male footballer.

Club career
Brennan joined the Newcastle Jets on 29 April 2015 from National Premier League side South Melbourne, signing a two-year deal. Due largely to ongoing injury problems, Brennan was forced to wait until 26 March 2016 to make his A-League debut against Perth Glory, replacing Mitch Cooper in a 2–1 loss. Brennan went on to make a total of three appearances in his maiden A-League season, all off the substitutes' bench.

On 19 January 2017, it was announced that Brennan had parted with the Jets by mutual consent. He made a total of five A-league appearances during his time with the Jets. He then returned to Bentleigh Greens SC in the Victorian Premier League.

In November 2018, Brennan signed with Green Gully of the NPL Victoria League.

Personal life
In an interview with the Herald Sun, Brennan came out as gay after being closeted for several months. He had previously dated women, but had been unsure of his sexuality for years, stating that it had been a "mental burden". Brennan is the first male Australian footballer to come out as gay, and one of only a few openly gay players playing professionally.

References

External links
 
 
 

1993 births
Living people
Sportspeople from Hobart
Australian soccer players
Association football forwards
South Hobart FC players
Newcastle Jets FC players
Green Gully SC players
South Melbourne FC players
Oakleigh Cannons FC players
National Premier Leagues players
A-League Men players
Sportsmen from Tasmania
Australian LGBT sportspeople
Gay sportsmen
Australian LGBT soccer players
21st-century Australian LGBT people
Soccer players from Tasmania